Cristian Cosmin Dumitru (born 13 December 2001) is a Romanian professional footballer who plays mainly as a forward.

Club career

FCSB
Cristian Dumitru made his European debut for FCSB on 11 July 2019 coming on as a substitute for Florinel Coman in a 2019–20 UEFA Europa League match against Milsami Orhei. He scored his first goal for FCSB in the 2nd leg, in the 4th minute of the game.

Academica Clinceni (loan)
On 22 July 2019, Dumitru was joined  on loan for the rest of the season.

Career statistics

Club
Statistics accurate as of match played 8 November 2022.

Honours

Club 
FCSB
 Cupa României: 2019–20

References

External links

2001 births
Living people
Romanian footballers
Association football midfielders
Liga I players
Liga II players
FC Steaua București players
LPS HD Clinceni players
FC Argeș Pitești players
CS Mioveni players
People from Buzău